The 2019 Baltic Futsal Cup was held on 2–4 December 2019 in Raasiku, Estonia. This edition featured the three Baltic teams.

Standings

Matches

Goalscorers 
Top Goalscorer:

Andrejs Baklanovs - 3

References

External links 
 Latvian Football Federation
 Lithuanian Football Federation
 Estonian Football Federation

International futsal competitions hosted by Latvia
2019
2019–20 in European futsal